Chlorociboria omnivirens is a species of fungus in the family Chlorociboriaceae.

References

External links

Helotiaceae
Fungi described in 1860
Taxa named by Miles Joseph Berkeley